Damian Raczkowski (born 11 April 1975 in Białystok) is a Polish politician. He was elected to the Sejm on 25 September 2005, getting 5,527 votes in 24 Białystok district as a candidate from the Civic Platform list.

See also
Members of Polish Sejm 2005-2007

External links
Damian Raczkowski - parliamentary page - includes declarations of interest, voting record, and transcripts of speeches.

Members of the Polish Sejm 2005–2007
Civic Platform politicians
1975 births
University of Białystok alumni
Living people
Members of the Polish Sejm 2007–2011
Members of the Polish Sejm 2011–2015